The 1951 Purdue Boilermakers football team was an American football team that represented Purdue University during the 1951 Big Ten Conference football season. In their fifth season under head coach Stu Holcomb, the Boilermakers compiled a 5–4 record, finished in second place in the Big Ten Conference with a 4–1 record against conference opponents, and outscored opponents by a total of 153 to 152.

Notable players on the 1951 Purdue team included quarterback Dale Samuels and end Leo Sugar.

Schedule

Game summaries

Minnesota
 Phil Klezek 13 rushes, 143 yards

References

Purdue
Purdue Boilermakers football seasons
Purdue Boilermakers football